is a Japanese music unit which is signed to Sacra Music. It consists of vocalist Mia, whose music videos and promotional images are illustrated by various artists. The unit began activities in 2015 when it uploaded its first song "Day Break" on YouTube, before making its major debut in 2016. Their music has been featured in anime television series such as Kiznaiver, Interviews with Monster Girls, Re:Creators, Slow Start, and The Honor Student at Magic High School. In addition to producing music, Mia also writes novels, with some of the unit's songs being based on her novels.

History
The unit began its activities in 2015 when vocalist Mia uploaded a song titled "Day Break" on YouTube. The song was produced by the internet musician Scop, and quickly gained attention. During this time, their videos and songs featured illustrations by artist Natsu Asami.

In 2016, the unit made its major debut with the release of the single , the title track of which was used as the ending theme to the anime television series Kiznaiver. Their second single  was released in December of the same year.  Their third single  was released in February 2017; the title track was used as the ending theme to the anime television series Interviews with Monster Girls. Their first album  was released on March 8, 2017.

The unit's fourth single, was released on August 30, 2017; the title track was used as an ending theme to the anime television series Re:Creators. Their fifth single,  was released on March 7, 2018; "Kaze no Koe o Kikinagara" was used as the ending theme to the anime television series Slow Start. Their sixth single  was released on November 21, 2018; the title track was used as the opening theme to the anime television series As Miss Beelzebub Likes. Their second album,  was released on November 21, 2018.

The unit released its third album  on September 30, 2020. They released their seventh single  on July 21, 2021; "101" was used as the opening theme to the anime television series The Honor Student at Magic High School.

In addition to producing music, the unit also writes novels. In 2018, vocalist Mia began writing novels; since then, some of the unit's songs have been based on her novels.

Discography

Singles
 (Release date: June 1, 2016)
 (Release date: December 14, 2016)
 (Release date: February 1, 2017)
 (Release date: August 30, 2017)
 (Release date: March 7, 2018)
 (Release date: July 21, 2021)

Albums
 (Release date: March 8, 2018)
 (Release date: November 21, 2018)
 (Release date: September 30, 2020)
 (Release date: March 9, 2022)

References

External links
Official website 

Anime musical groups
Japanese musical groups
Musical groups established in 2015
Sacra Music artists